Realms of Darkness is a fantasy video game developed by Strategic Simulations and released in 1986. It was developed for the Apple II and Commodore 64.

Plot
Realms of Darkness is a game in which is the player must complete seven different quests, exploring over 30 dungeon levels, and adventurers can go to several cities, shops, and wilderness areas.

Reception
SSI sold 9,022 copies of Realms of Darkness in North America. Computer Gaming World called the game "of only moderate interest" and described its graphics, quests, and puzzles as mediocre, but stated that the game might be suitable for a beginner to computer RPGs. COMPUTE! called Realms of Darkness "a well-planned product with several interesting features not previously implemented in a fantasy game. Most fantasy gamers will want to take a look". The game was reviewed in 1987 in Dragon #122 by Patricia Lesser in "The Role of Computers" column. Lesser felt the game "combines both the excitement and danger of a menu-driven fantasy role-playing game with the flexibility and thought-provoking requirements of a text-adventure game." The game was revisited in Dragon #124, where the reviewers stated that "Realms of Darkness is enjoyable (despite the mediocre graphics), and you’ll immerse yourself in its secrets for many, many hours."

Reviews
Family Computing #49

References

External links
 
 

1986 video games
Apple II games
Commodore 64 games
Fantasy video games
MSX2 games
NEC PC-8801 games
NEC PC-9801 games
Role-playing video games
Sharp X1 games
Strategic Simulations games
Video games developed in the United States
X68000 games